St Johnstone Football Club is a Scottish professional association football club based in Perth. The club was officially formed in 1884 and the team played its first game in February 1885. St Johnstone first appeared in the Scottish Cup in the 1886–87 season and they joined the Scottish Football League in 1911–12. The club has had three home grounds, the current one since 1989 is McDiarmid Park.

St Johnstone have won three major honours. Their first was the Scottish Cup, winning the 2014 final with a 2–0 win against Dundee United. They then won a domestic cup double in 2021 by winning 1–0 in both the 2021 Scottish Cup Final and the 2021 Scottish League Cup Final (February). They are the third existing Scottish team (with Celtic and Rangers) to achieve that double. St Johnstone's highest placing in the league is third (three times, most recently in 2013). They have qualified for either the UEFA Cup or the Europa League in eight seasons; these include four consecutive seasons from 2013 to 2016.

St Johnstone have spent 52 seasons to 2022–23 in the top tier of the Scottish football league system, including a current run of 14 seasons (four in the Scottish Premier League and ten since 2013 in the Scottish Premiership) since their most recent promotion in 2008–09. They have spent 44 seasons in the second tier and four in the third. The table summarises their seasons from 1886–87 in Scottish and European football. It highlights the club's achievements in senior first team competitions and names, where known, the top goalscorer(s) in each season. Some seasons to 1921–22 and the wartime seasons 1915–19 and 1939–45, in which the club did not compete in top-level football (e.g., Scottish Football League, Scottish Cup), are excluded.

Key

 D1 = Scottish Football League First Division (first tier to 1975)
 PD = Scottish Football League Premier Division (first tier from 1975 to 1998)
 PL = Scottish Premier League (first tier from 1998 to 2013)
 SP = Scottish Premiership (first tier from 2013)
 D2 = Scottish Football League Second Division (second tier to 1975)
 FD = Scottish Football League First Division (second tier from 1975 to 2013)
 SD = Scottish Football League Second Division (third tier from 1975 to 2013)
 DB = Southern League B Division
 P = Games played
 W = Games won
 D = Games drawn
 L = Games lost
 F = Goals for
 A = Goals against
 Pts = Points
 Pos = Final position

 Grp = Group stage
 PO = Play-offs
 1QR = 1st qualifying round
 2QR = 2nd qualifying round
 3QR = 3rd qualifying round
 R1 = Round 1
 R2 = Round 2
 R3 = Round 3
 R4 = Round 4
 R5 = Round 5
 R6 = Round 6
 QF = Quarter-finals
 SF = Semi-finals
 RU = Runners-up

Seasons
The table is correct to the end of the 2021–22 season.''

Seasons in which the team were promoted have the league position in green. Seasons in which the team were relegated have the league position in red.

Footnotes

References
General
 
 

Specific

Further reading

External links
 

Seasons
 
Saint Johnstone
Seasons